The Women's under-23 road race at the 2015 European Road Championships took place on 8 August. The Championships were hosted by the Estonian city Tartu. The course was 124 km long. 76 cyclists competed in the time trial, of which 18 did not finish.

Top 10 final classification

See also
 2015 European Road Championships – Women's under-23 time trial

References

European Road Championships – Women's U23 road race
2015 European Road Championships
2015 in women's road cycling